Rodrigo José Rivera Sánchez (born 16 August 1993) is a Salvadoran professional footballer who plays as a midfielder for Primera División club FAS.

Career
Rivera began his career with Juventud Independiente, before moving to Alianza F.C. in 2015. After winning 3 Primera División de Fútbol de El Salvador, he moved to Santa Tecla where he helped them win their own Primera División title.

International career
Rivera made his debut with the El Salvador national team in a 1–1 friendly tie with Nicaragua on 9 March 2016.

Honours
Alianza
Primera División de Fútbol de El Salvador: 2015–16 Apertura, 2017–18 Apertura, 2017–18 Clausura

Santa Tecla
Primera División de Fútbol de El Salvador: 2018–19 Apertura
Copa El Salvador: 2018–19

References

External links
 
 

1993 births
Living people
People from La Libertad Department (El Salvador)
Salvadoran footballers
El Salvador international footballers
Association football midfielders
Alianza F.C. footballers
Salvadoran Primera División players